Pultenaea trinervis, commonly known as three-nerved bush-pea,<ref name="efloraSA">{{cite web |title=Pultenaea trinervis'''' |url=http://www.flora.sa.gov.au/cgi-bin/speciesfacts_display.cgi?form=speciesfacts&name=Pultenaea_trinervis |publisher=State Herbarium of South Australia |access-date=14 September 2021}}</ref> is a species of flowering plant in the family Fabaceae and is endemic to the south-east of South Australia. It is a low, prostrate to erect shrub with hairy, elliptic to lance-shaped leaves and yellow to orange and red, pea-like flowers.

The edges of the leaves have long hairs and the lower surface is softly-hairy with three veins visible.

TaxonomyPultenaea trinervis was first formally described in 1923 by John McConnell Black in the Transactions and proceedings of the Royal Society of South Australia from specimens collected near Port Lincoln. The specific epithet (trinervis'') means "three-nerved".

Distribution and habitat
Three-nerved bush-pea grows in heathland and mallee on the Eyre Peninsula, southern Mount Lofty Ranges and Kangaroo Island in South Australia.

References

Fabales of Australia
Flora of South Australia
trinervis
Plants described in 1923
Taxa named by John McConnell Black